Valdrin Rashica (born 14 December 1994) is a Kosovan professional footballer who plays as a midfielder for Finnish club Ekenäs IF.

Club career

Skënderbeu Korçë
On 9 January 2016, Rashica joined in the preparatory camp of Kategoria Superiore club Skënderbeu Korçë. On 2 February 2016, the club confirmed that Rashica had joined on a permanent transfer. On 6 April 2016, he made his debut with Skënderbeu Korçë in the 2015–16 Albanian Cup semi-final against Laçi after coming on as a substitute at 54th minute in place of Gerhard Progni.

Teuta Durrës
On 16 August 2016, Rashica signed a one-year contract with Kategoria Superiore club Teuta Durrës. On 12 September 2016, he made his debut in a 3–0 away defeat against Kukësi after coming on as a substitute at 61st minute in place of Rustem Hoxha.

Espoo
On 9 April 2017, Rashica joined Kakkonen side Espoo. Five days later, he made his debut in a 2–1 home win against FC Jazz after being named in the starting line-up. On 5 November 2018, Rashica was named the best player in Group B of Kakkonen.

Lahti
On 3 January 2020, Rashica signed a one-year contract with Veikkausliiga club Lahti. On 25 January 2020, he made his debut with Lahti in the 2020 Finnish Cup group stage against Ilves after being named in the starting line-up.

Ekenäs IF
On 1 February 2021, Rashica joined Ykkönen side Ekenäs IF. Six days later, he made his debut in the 2021 Finnish Cup group stage against TPS after being named in the starting line-up.

Career statistics

Club

References

External links

1992 births
Living people
Sportspeople from Vushtrri
Association football midfielders
Kosovan footballers
Kosovan expatriate footballers
Kosovan expatriate sportspeople in Albania
Kosovan expatriate sportspeople in Finland
Football Superleague of Kosovo players
KF Vushtrria players
Kategoria Superiore players
KF Skënderbeu Korçë players
KF Teuta Durrës players
Kakkonen players
Ekenäs IF players
FC Espoo players
Ykkönen players
Veikkausliiga players
FC Lahti players